Parliamentary elections were held in Rwanda on 28 December 1981, the first since 1969. The country was still a one-party state, but now with the National Revolutionary Movement for Development as the sole legal party in place of MDR-Parmehutu, following the 1978 constitutional referendum. A new constitution created the National Development Council, a 64-seat national legislature. Two candidates contested each constituency. Voter turnout was 96%.

Results

References

Elections in Rwanda
Parliamentary
Rwanda
One-party elections
Parliament of Rwanda